Kindergarten Cop is a 1990 American action comedy film directed by Ivan Reitman and distributed by Universal Pictures. Arnold Schwarzenegger stars as John Kimble, a tough police detective working undercover as a kindergarten teacher to apprehend drug dealer Cullen Crisp (Richard Tyson) before he can get to his former wife and son. While undercover, Kimble discovers a passion for teaching he never knew he had and considers changing his profession to become an educator. Pamela Reed plays his partner, Phoebe O'Hara, and Penelope Ann Miller plays Joyce, the teacher who becomes his love interest. The original music score was composed by Randy Edelman. The film was released in the United States on December 21, 1990, and grossed $202 million worldwide. A direct-to-video sequel, Kindergarten Cop 2, was released in 2016.

Plot
After years of pursuing Cullen Crisp, an infamous drug dealer, LAPD detective John Kimble arrests him for murder; a girl named Cindy witnessed Crisp murder an informant after getting information regarding the whereabouts of his former wife, Rachel, who he claims stole millions of dollars from him before fleeing with his son, Cullen, Jr. 

Partnered with former teacher-turned-detective Phoebe O'Hara, Kimble goes undercover in Astoria, Oregon, to find Rachel and offer her immunity in exchange for testifying against Crisp in court. O'Hara is tasked with finding Rachel through her son by acting as a substitute teacher in a kindergarten class at Astoria Elementary School. However, she is incapacitated by a severe stomach flu, so Kimble takes her place.

The suspicious school principal, Miss Schlowski, is convinced Kimble will not last long before quitting. Though initially overwhelmed, he adapts to his new status quickly, despite not having any formal teaching experience. With the use of his pet ferret as a class mascot, positive reinforcement, his police training as a model for structure in class, and his experience as a father, he becomes a much admired and cherished figure to the students.

Kimble begins to enjoy his undercover role. At one point, he deals with a case of child abuse by assaulting, threatening and pressing charges against the father of an abused student, winning Miss Schlowski's favor. She assures him that even though she does not agree with his methods, she can see that he is a good teacher. Kimble also becomes fond of Joyce, a fellow teacher whose son Dominic is one of his students. She is estranged from her husband and will not speak of him, telling Dominic that he lives in France. 

Conversing with the gradually more trusting Joyce, Kimble deduces that she is Rachel and that Dominic is Cullen, Jr. Back in California, the case holding Crisp in jail is closed after Cindy dies from using tainted cocaine provided by Crisp's mother, Eleanor. He is subsequently released from prison and quickly travels to Astoria with Eleanor to search for Dominic.

When Kimble learns Crisp has been released, he confronts Rachel about her identity, saying he can protect her if she cooperates. She is outraged that he misled her, but she tells him that Crisp lied about her stealing money from him, to convince drug dealers to help him find her. Crisp's real reason for searching for her was to find his son, as he was irritated that Rachel disappeared with him.

Crisp starts a fire in the library as a distraction to kidnap his son, then uses the boy as a hostage when Kimble arrives. Just as Crisp declares his intention to take his son away and prepares to shoot Kimble, Kimble's ferret, which was hiding in Dominic's sweater, bites Crisp in the neck, allowing Dominic to escape. In pain, Crisp wildly shoots at Kimble, hitting him in the leg; Kimble then fatally shoots Crisp. 

Outside, Eleanor injures O'Hara with her car before going inside and discovering Crisp dead. She shoots Kimble in the shoulder and demands he tell her where Dominic is, but O'Hara appears and knocks Eleanor unconscious with a baseball bat. Eleanor is then arrested and the unconscious Kimble is hospitalized with O'Hara, with both of them making a full recovery. 

O'Hara returns to the police force in Los Angeles while Kimble decides to resign, staying in Astoria to become a kindergarten teacher at the school full time. Joyce joins him and they share a kiss while everyone cheers.

Cast

Production

Casting
Bill Murray and Patrick Swayze were approached to play the role of Kimble. Danny DeVito was also considered for the role, but Ivan Reitman nixed the idea due to the actor's height.

Director Ivan Reitman and casting director Michael Chinich auditioned more than 2,000 children for the roles of the students. Elijah Wood unsuccessfully auditioned for a role.

Filming
Exterior scenes at Astoria Elementary School were filmed at John Jacob Astor Elementary School, located at 3550 Franklin Avenue in Astoria, Oregon.

Universal Studios hired local artists Judith Niland and Carl Lyle Jenkins to paint murals on the walls at Astoria, and provided new playground equipment, a fenced playground, and a new lawn and hedges around the school. Most of the filming was completed after school was out in June 1990, allowing many of the students and faculty to be extras in the film. Students' artwork was also used. While on location, Schwarzenegger insisted a private studio for daily workouts and weightlifting be assembled for his use.

Other locations used in or near Astoria include the Bayview Motel, Commercial Street in downtown Astoria, and exteriors outside the Seafare Restaurant on Industry Street. The school picnic was filmed at Ecola State Park near Cannon Beach, Oregon, twenty five miles south of Astoria. Scenes at Joyce and Dominic's house were filmed at a private residence located at 414 Exchange Street and highway scenes were filmed on U.S. 26 east of Seaside, Oregon, twenty miles from Astoria.

Interior school scenes were shot at Universal Studios in Hollywood. The film's opening scene was filmed at the Westfield MainPlace in Santa Ana, California, and South Coast Plaza in Costa Mesa, California.

Music

Reception

Box office
Kindergarten Cop grossed $91.4 million in North America, $110.5 in other territories, and $202 million worldwide. It was released in the United Kingdom on February 1, 1991, and topped the country's box office that weekend.

Critical response
On Rotten Tomatoes, the film has a rating of 53% based on 38 reviews, and an average rating of 5.50/10. The site's consensus reads, "Arnold Schwarzenegger substitutes his action brio with some refreshingly adept comedic timing, but Kindergarten Cop is too grim for children and too cloying for adults." On Metacritic, it has a score of 61 out of 100, based on 15 critics, indicating "generally favorable reviews." Audiences polled by CinemaScore gave it an average grade of "A−" on an A+ to F scale. Reviewer Caryn James of The New York Times said, "Like Twins, which was also directed by Ivan Reitman, nothing in the film is as funny as the idea of it."

In Kim Newman's review for Empire, he wrote, "with a heart of purest mush, the film still manages to be generally entertaining" and gave it 3 stars out of 5. An Entertainment Weekly review at the time of release notes that: "the movie never quite gels and it is not going to generate quite the mega hit business their producers are counting on", giving it a "C" grade.

Roger Ebert said the film: "is made up of two parts that shouldn't fit, but somehow they do, making a slick entertainment out of the improbable, the impossible and Arnold Schwarzenegger" and awarded it three stars.

On April Fool's Day 2012, as a prank, the film was announced to be selected for a release on DVD and Blu-ray Disc as part of the Criterion Collection, a video distribution company dedicated to the release of "important classic and contemporary films". It was said to be selected as important in part because of its genre revisionist use of both the policier and family comedy genres in the same film. It was officially released on Blu-ray, though not by Criterion, on July 1, 2014.

Legacy
For the video game Silent Hill, parts of Astoria Elementary School from the film were used as reference for the location Midwich Elementary School. Several of Schwarzenegger's memorable lines from the film were used in sound boards for prank phone calls that became popular in the early 2000s. During an April 2021 interview on Jimmy Kimmel Live!, Schwarzenegger stated that the idea behind the making of Superhero Kindergarten came from his desire "to do a sequel to Kindergarten Cop".

Sequel

Dolph Lundgren was seen shooting scenes for the film. The sequel, Kindergarten Cop 2, was released direct to DVD in May 2016.

See also

 Arnold Schwarzenegger filmography
 List of American films of 1990
 Olympian Anthony Adam, an Indian film with a similar plot

References

External links

 
 
 
 

1990 films
1990 action comedy films
1990s comedy thriller films
American action comedy films
American comedy thriller films
American police detective films
1990s English-language films
Fictional portrayals of the Los Angeles Police Department
Films about educators
Films about witness protection
Films directed by Ivan Reitman
Films produced by Brian Grazer
Films produced by Ivan Reitman
Films scored by Randy Edelman
Films set in Astoria, Oregon
Films set in Los Angeles
Films shot in Astoria, Oregon
Films shot in Los Angeles
Films shot in California
Films set in California
Films shot in Oregon
Films set in Oregon
Films with screenplays by Herschel Weingrod
Films with screenplays by Murray Salem
Films with screenplays by Timothy Harris (writer)
Homophobia in fiction
Imagine Entertainment films
Universal Pictures films
1990s American films